is a Japanese curler, a three-time  (1993, 1997, 1998) and a three-time Japan women's champion (1997, 1998, 1999).

She played for Japan at the 1998 Winter Olympics, where the Japanese team finished in fifth place.

Teams

References

External links

Nagano 1998 - Official Report Vol. 3 (web archive; "Curling" chapter starts at page 236)
Akemi Niwa - Curling - Nihon Olympic Iinkai (Japanese Olympic Committee - JOC)

Living people
1973 births
People from Kitami, Hokkaido
Sportspeople from Hokkaido
Japanese female curlers
Pacific-Asian curling champions
Japanese curling champions
Curlers at the 1998 Winter Olympics
Olympic curlers of Japan
20th-century Japanese women
21st-century Japanese women